Arthur Winther (28 March 1937 – 16 April 2022) was an Australian diver. He competed in the men's 3 metre springboard event at the 1956 Summer Olympics.

References

External links
 

1937 births
2022 deaths
Australian male divers
Olympic divers of Australia
Divers at the 1956 Summer Olympics
Sportsmen from Victoria (Australia)